Badanpur may refer to any of the following villages:

 Badanpur, Magura, in Magura District, Bangladesh
 Badanpur, Mathura, in Mathura district, Uttar Pradesh, India
 Badanpur, Narwana, in Narwana Tehsil, Haryana, India